Guxhagen is a municipality in Schwalm-Eder district in northern Hesse, Germany.

Geography
Guxhagen lies about 15 km south of Kassel between the Habichtswald Nature Park and the Meißner-Kaufunger Wald Nature Park on the river Fulda. It neighbors Edermünde, Felsberg, Fuldabrück and Körle. The community consists of the six centers of Albshausen, Büchenwerra, Ellenberg, Grebenau, Guxhagen and Wollrode.

History
Guxhagen was first documented in 1352 under the name Kukushayn.

From 1664-1941, there were Jewish families living in Guxhagen who formed their own community and built a synagogue and school. After the events at the Kristallnacht pogrom of 1938, the number of community members decreased to 64 in 1939 (3.3% of 1,919). In connection with the November pogrom, eleven Jewish men and a  boy were arrested and brought to Breitenau concentration camp.
After this event, many Jews left. During The Holocaust the rest of Jews were deported to concentration camps and most of them died.

Politics

Municipal council

Municipal council is made up of 31 members.
 SPD 14 seats
 Gemeinschaftsliste Guxhagen ("community list") 7 seats
 CDU 6 seats
 Greens 4 seats
(as of municipal elections held on 2011)

Economy and infrastructure

Transport
Guxhagen lies on Federal Highway (Bundesstraße) B 83 and Autobahn A 7 (Kassel – Bad Hersfeld).

The community belongs to the North Hesse Transport Network, which among other things runs a hailed shared taxi within the greater community and offers local train connections.

Personalities
 Karl Glinzer (painter)
 Friedrich Paulus (general)
 Christoph Weber (librarian)

References

Schwalm-Eder-Kreis
Holocaust locations in Germany